Eggs-and-bacon or eggs and bacon is a common name for various plants with yellow and red flowers in the family Fabaceae, including:

 Lotus corniculatus, native to Eurasia and North Africa
 The Bossiaeeae and  Mirbelieae tribes of legumes native to Australia, including genera:
 Aenictophyton
 Almaleea 
 Aotus
 Bossiaea
 Callistachys
 Chorizema
 Daviesia
 Dillwynia 
 Erichsenia 
 Euchilopsis
 Eutaxia
 Gastrolobium
 Gompholobium
 Goodia
 Isotropis
 Jacksonia
 Latrobea
 Leptosema 
 Mirbelia
 Muelleranthus 
 Oxylobium
 Phyllota
 Platylobium
 Podolobium
 Ptychosema
 Pultenaea
 Sphaerolobium
 Stonesiella
 Urodon
 Viminaria

See also
 Butter-and-eggs (disambiguation)